Alexandra Soumm (born 17 May 1989 in Moscow, Russia) is a French violinist from Montpellier.

Early life 
Soumm comes from a family of musicians. Her Ukrainian father and grandfather were violinists, and her a Russian mother pianist. She grew up in Montepellier, France, and lives in Paris.

From 2000–2008 she was at the University of Graz doing a preparation course. She studied at the Music and Arts University of the City of Vienna with Boris Kuschnir.

Career 
In 2002 she won the Fidelio competition for violins of Music and Arts University of the City of Vienna. She won the Eurovision Young Musicians 2004 representing Austria in Lucerne, Switzerland. She was a member of the BBC Radio 3 New Generation Artists scheme during its 2010–2012 season. She had solo performances with the London Philharmonic, BBC London, NKK Tokio, Danish National Orchester, Münchner Symphoniker, Baltimore Symphony, Orchestre de Paris. She performed with many conductors including Rafael Frühbeck de Burgos, Herbert Blomstedt, Osmo Vänskä, Marin Alsop and Seiji Ozawa.

Soumm participates in events with young musicians, like the Ilumina Festival in Brazil. In 2012 she created the Esperanz'Arts organisation with Maria Mosconi, altiste, and pianist Paloma Kouider. In 2019 it had a hundred members, and partners with hospitals, prisons, schools.

References

External links

Living people
1989 births
21st-century French women violinists
Russian violinists
Women classical violinists
French people of Russian descent
French people of Ukrainian descent
Musicians from Moscow
21st-century classical violinists
Winners of Eurovision Young Musicians
University of Graz alumni
University of Music and Performing Arts Vienna alumni